Vasily Kuzmich Bochkaryov (29 April 1949 – 22 June 2016) was a Russian politician. He served as Head of Zheleznodorozhny District of Penza from 1987 to 1998, and was elected Head of the Administration of Penza Oblast in April 1998. He became Governor of Penza Oblast in June 1998, and since then has been re-elected two times – in 2002 and 2005. He won his 2002 election by a small margin over his Communist challenger. Since 2015 until his death, Bochkaryov represented Penza Oblast in the Federation Council of Russia.

Early life and education
Vasily Bochkaryov was born on 29 April 1949 to a peasant family in the village of Iva, in Nizhnelomovsky District of Penza Oblast, Russian SSR.

In 1968, Bochkaryov completed Alatyrsk Forest Industry Technical School, then he enrolled at Maxim Gorky Mari Polytechnic Institute and graduated as a forestry engineer in 1973. He later continued his studies and graduated from Penza State Technical University with a degree in State and Municipal Management in 1994, and from the Penza State Agricultural Academy with a degree in Economics and Agricultural Production Management in 1999.

In 2002, he defended his Candidate of Sociological Sciences dissertation at Modern Humanitarian Institute, titled "The Level and Quality of Life as the Object of Control (Regional Aspect)". On 29 September 2013, the community Dissernet published the results of their examination of his thesis, which revealed extensive plagiarism from two other theses.

Career

Early career
Bochkaryov began his career in 1973 as a forester in Penza Oblast. From 1975 to 1976, he worked as Chief Forester in Kameshkirsky District of Penza Oblast, and then headed the regional forestry workers' supply department until 1977.

He became Superintendent and Deputy Chief of Penza Transport Enterprise No. 1547 in 1977, then headed the Penza Cargo-Motor Transport Enterprise No. 2 from 1980 to 1987. He joined the CPSU at that time.

Executive-branch service
On 27 April 1987 he was elected Chairman of Penza's Zheleznodorozhny District Executive Committee, while simultaneously serving as Chairman of District Soviet of People's Deputies since 1990. During that time, he befriended Anatoly Kovlyagin, Chairman of Penza Oblast Executive Committee.  He died on 22 June 2016 at the age of 67.

Accusations of academic dishonesty
The grassroots expert community  Dissernet accused Vasily Bochkarev of heavily plagiarising his Candidate of Sciences thesis.

References

External links 
  

1949 births
2016 deaths
Governors of Penza Oblast
People involved in plagiarism controversies
United Russia politicians
21st-century Russian politicians
Members of the Federation Council of Russia (1996–2000)
Members of the Federation Council of Russia (after 2000)
People from Nizhnelomovsky District
Penza State University alumni
Communist Party of the Soviet Union members
Recipients of the Order "For Merit to the Fatherland", 3rd class
Recipients of the Order of Honour (Russia)